Psalm 55 is the 55th psalm of the Book of Psalms, beginning in English in the King James Version, "Give ear to my prayer, O God, and hide not thyself from my supplication". The Book of Psalms forms part of the ketuvim, the third section of the Hebrew Bible, and is part of the Christian Old Testament. In the slightly different numbering system of the Greek Septuagint version of the Bible, and in the Latin Vulgate, this psalm is Psalm 54. In Latin, it is known as "Exaudi Deus orationem meam". The psalm is a lament in which the author grieves because he is surrounded by enemies, and one of his closest friends has betrayed him.  

The psalm forms a regular part of Jewish, Catholic, Lutheran, Anglican and other Protestant liturgies. Metrical hymns in English and German were derived from the psalm, and it has been set to music.

Background 
Psalm 55 is similar to Psalm 41, especially 41:9: "Even my close friend in whom I trusted, who ate my bread, has lifted his heel against me" (ESV).

The introduction to the psalm identifies it as a 'Maskil' (instructional piece) and associates it with David. The anonymous author may have been an Israelite living in a foreign city, and the false friend could be another Israelite living there. This interpretation may be considered especially plausible if the second part of verse 24 is translated "men of idols and figurines", as suggested by Hermann Gunkel and used in Mitchell Dahood's translation, rather than "men of blood and treachery".

Jerome, in the Vulgate, entitled this psalm Vox Christi adversus magnatos Judaeorum et Judam traditorem, meaning The voice of Christ against the chiefs of the Jews and the traitor Judas.

Text

King James Version 
 Give ear to my prayer, O God; and hide not thyself from my supplication.
 Attend unto me, and hear me: I mourn in my complaint, and make a noise;
 Because of the voice of the enemy, because of the oppression of the wicked: for they cast iniquity upon me, and in wrath they hate me.
 My heart is sore pained within me: and the terrors of death are fallen upon me.
 Fearfulness and trembling are come upon me, and horror hath overwhelmed me.
 And I said, Oh that I had wings like a dove! for then would I fly away, and be at rest.
 Lo, then would I wander far off, and remain in the wilderness. Selah.
 I would hasten my escape from the windy storm and tempest.
 Destroy, O Lord, and divide their tongues: for I have seen violence and strife in the city.
 Day and night they go about it upon the walls thereof: mischief also and sorrow are in the midst of it.
 Wickedness is in the midst thereof: deceit and guile depart not from her streets.
 For it was not an enemy that reproached me; then I could have borne it: neither was it he that hated me that did magnify himself against me; then I would have hid myself from him:
 But it was thou, a man mine equal, my guide, and mine acquaintance.
 We took sweet counsel together, and walked unto the house of God in company.
 Let death seize upon them, and let them go down quick into hell: for wickedness is in their dwellings, and among them.
 As for me, I will call upon God; and the LORD shall save me.
 Evening, and morning, and at noon, will I pray, and cry aloud: and he shall hear my voice.
 He hath delivered my soul in peace from the battle that was against me: for there were many with me.
 God shall hear, and afflict them, even he that abideth of old. Selah. Because they have no changes, therefore they fear not God.
 He hath put forth his hands against such as be at peace with him: he hath broken his covenant.
 The words of his mouth were smoother than butter, but war was in his heart: his words were softer than oil, yet were they drawn swords.
 Cast thy burden upon the LORD, and he shall sustain thee: he shall never suffer the righteous to be moved.
 But thou, O God, shalt bring them down into the pit of destruction: bloody and deceitful men shall not live out half their days; but I will trust in thee.

Structure
The psalm can be divided into three sections, which Alexander Kirkpatrick in his 1901 commentary identified with the themes of despair, indignation, and trust:
The first section (vss. 1–8) begins with a desperate appeal to God for deliverance (vss. 1–3) and then launches into a description of the psalmist's anguish and his desire for peace.
Verses 9–15 are a strident denunciation of the author's enemies, especially an individual described as "my equal" and "my familiar friend" who has turned against the psalmist (vss. 12–14). This second section closes with a wish that the speaker's enemies be swallowed alive in Sheol, a possible allusion to the fate of Korah.
The final section (vss. 16–23) is a confident meditation on God's justice. The psalmist is sure that God will save him and destroy the wicked.

Analysis
It is unclear whether the psalm was written by a single author or not. Some scholars suggest that verses 12–14, 20–21, and 22 are fragments by a different author which were inserted into the text of the original psalm.

In a 1999 article, Ulrike Bail used intertextual interpretive methods to read the psalm as a reference to the rape of Tamar.

Uses

Judaism
Verse 14 is found in Pirkei Avot Chapter 6, no. 3.
Verse 19 is found in the prayers recited following Motzei Shabbat Maariv.
Verse 24 is found in Pirkei Avot Chapter 5, no. 22.

New Testament
Verse 22 is quoted in 1 Peter .

Book of Common Prayer
In the Church of England's Book of Common Prayer, this psalm is appointed to be read on the evening of the tenth day of the month.

Musical settings 
Heinrich Schütz set Psalm 55 in a metred version in German, "Erhör mein Gebet, du treuer Gott", SWV 152, as part of the Becker Psalter, first published in 1628. The text was set to music as Hear My Prayer by Felix Mendelssohn in 1844. Antonín Dvořák set verses 1–8 in Czech to music in his Biblical Songs (1894). Zoltán Kodály set Psalm 55 in Hungarian in 1923 with interpolations and extensions of grief and lamentation full of historic associations for the Hungarian people to the paraphrase by 16th-century poet , as the Psalmus Hungaricus, Op. 13. Alan Hovhaness set portions of the text, along with portions of Psalms 54 and 56, in his choral work Make a Joyful Noise.

Notes

Bibliography

External links 

  in Hebrew and English – Mechon-mamre
 
 
 Text of Psalm 55 according to the 1928 Psalter
 Psalm 55 – Trusting God Against a Treacherous Enemy text and detailed commentary, enduringword.com
United States Conference of Catholic Bishops, For the leader. On stringed instruments. A maskil of David. / Listen, God, to my prayer; do not hide from my pleading text and footnotes, usccb.org 
 Psalm 55:1 introduction and text, biblestudytools.com
 Psalm 55 / Refrain: Cast your burden upon the Lord and he will sustain you. Church of England
 Psalm 55 at biblegateway.com
 Charles H. Spurgeon: Psalm 55 detailed commentary, archive.spurgeon.org
 

055
Works attributed to David